Mike Balogun (born September 28, 1983) is an American heavyweight boxer, and a former professional football linebacker. He was signed as an undrafted free agent by the San Francisco 49ers in 2010. He played college football for the Oklahoma Sooners.

He has also played for the Washington Redskins, Tampa Bay Buccaneers, Buffalo Bills, Dallas Cowboys, and Virginia Destroyers. His name "Balogun" means "Warlord" in Yoruba.

College career
Balogun began at Lackawanna College in Scranton, Pennsylvania. He was a standout inside linebacker for the Oklahoma Sooners in 2008. He was declared ineligible to play the 2009 season because he allegedly played for the Maryland Marauders of the North American Football League, a minor league team in Maryland after turning 21 years old.

Professional career

San Francisco 49ers
The San Francisco 49ers signed Balogun before training camp in 2010. He was cut during the final cuts on September 3, 2010.

Washington Redskins
Balogun signed to the Washington Redskins' practice squad on September 6, 2010.

Tampa Bay Buccaneers
Balogun signed to the Tampa Bay Buccaneers' practice squad on October 11, 2010.

Buffalo Bills
Balogun was signed by the Buffalo Bills on November 10, 2010. He played in his first career game in week 13. He was released on February 11, 2011.

Dallas Cowboys
Balogun was signed by the Dallas Cowboys on February 14, 2011.

Indianapolis Colts
The Indianapolis Colts signed Balogun on August 15, 2012.

Professional boxing record

References

External links
 Buffalo Bills bio
 Oklahoma Sooners bio
 San Francisco 49ers bio
 Tampa Bay Buccaneers bio

1983 births
Living people
American football linebackers
Oklahoma Sooners football players
San Francisco 49ers players
Washington Redskins players
Tampa Bay Buccaneers players
Buffalo Bills players
Dallas Cowboys players
Indianapolis Colts players
American people of Yoruba descent
Yoruba sportspeople